Phragmipedium is a genus of the Orchid family (Orchidaceae) (Subfamily Cypripedioideae) and the only genus comprised in the tribe Phragmipedieae and subtribe Phragmipediinae. The name of the genus is derived from the Greek phragma, which means "division", and pedium, which means "slipper" (referring to the pouch). It is abbreviated 'Phrag' in trade journals.  

About 20 species of these lady's slipper orchids are known from SW Mexico, Central and tropical South America.

All Phragmipedium species are listed under Appendix I of the Convention on International Trade in Endangered Species (CITES), meaning that commercial international trade in wild-sourced specimens is prohibited, while non-commercial trade is regulated.

Taxonomy 

The genus Phragmipedium  is divided into several sections :
 Phragmipedium : P. caudatum, P. exstaminodium, P. lindenii
 Himantopetalum : P. caricinum, P. christiansenianum, P. pearcei, P. klotzscheanum, P. richteri, P. tetzlaffianum.
 Platypetalum : P. lindleyanum
 Lorifolia : P. boissierianum, P. hirtzii, P. longifolium, P. vittatum
 Micropetalum : P. besseae, P. besseae var. dalessandroi, P. fischeri, P. kovachii, P. schlimii.
 Schluckebieria : P. kovachii

The exact number of species is still being discussed among specialists : O. Gruss recognizes 20 species, compared to the 15 species accepted by Lucile M. McCook (see References).

Most Phragmipedium species are either terrestrial, epiphytic or lithophytic in habit. They show a unique shieldlike staminode, long, moustache-like petals and a 3-locular ovary. The large pouchlike lip is curved inwards at the margins. The acute leaves attain a length of about 80 cm. The stem lacks pseudobulbs and grows about 80 cm high, showing 2 to 3 flowers.

Phragmipedium besseae was first found in Peru by Elizabeth Locke Besse in 1981. Soon afterwards, the site was plundered and destroyed by orchid hunters. Luckily enough seed was preserved, to avert extinction. This orchid is unusual, because its flowers have a bright orange-red to almost strong salmon-red color (there is also a yellow variety), unseen in any lady's slipper orchid. The oval-shaped petals are wide. The narrow leaves are elliptic in shape.  It has since been used extensively in hybridization.

Phragmipedium caudatum is considered a complex, i.e. it could contain several species or subspecies, based on differences in flower size and color. This orchid with a short stem is semi-terrestrial, semi-lithophytic to epiphytic, depending on the substrate . The cream-colored flowers are laced with greenish stripes. The lateral spiraling, drooping petals are red-tinted and very long, even reaching the soil. They grow on wet, moss-covered hillsides.

Phragmipedium lindleyanum, named after John Lindley, forms a rosette of five long linear leaves with a yellow margin, reaching a length of 50 cm. The erect raceme can grow as high as 1 m. It is many-flowered and sometimes branched at the basis. The flowers open in succession, giving the orchid a long blooming period. The hoary flowers are green with brown veins. The glabrous, pouchlike lip is yellow, with red veins.

Phragmipedium longifolium, described in 1852 by H.G. Reichenbach f. and J. v. Warscewicz, has long lanceolate leaves without yellow margin, growing to a length of 60 cm. The inflorescence reaches a length of 1 m, with about 10 flowers, opening in succession. The long lateral petals are purplish green. The rather small glabrous labellum has a green color.

Allied genera include Paphiopedilum, Selenipedium, Cypripedium and the monotypic Mexipedium.

There are many interspecific hybrids. Rare crossings have been made between Phragmipedium and Paphiopedilum.

The genus Uropedium Lindl. is generally included in Phragmipedium.

Species 
The following species are recognized:
 Phragmipedium andreettae P. J. Cribb & Pupulin  – Ecuador
 Phragmipedium besseae Dodson & J.Kuhn  – Ecuador to N. Peru.
 Phragmipedium boissierianum (Rchb.f.) Rolfe  – S. Ecuador to Peru.
 Phragmipedium brasiliense Quené & O.Gruss  – Brazil
 Phragmipedium cabrejosii  Alexander Damián, Melissa Díaz Morales & Franco Pupulin – Peru
 Phragmipedium caricinum (Lindl. & Paxton) Rolfe  – Bolivia.
 Phragmipedium caudatum (Lindl.) Rolfe  – Bolivia to Peru.
 Phragmipedium chapadense Campacci & R.Takase  – Brazil.
 Phragmipedium exstaminodium Castaño, Hágsater & E.Aguirre  – Chiapas, Mexico to Guatemala.
 Phragmipedium fischeri Braem & H.Mohr – Ecuador.
 Phragmipedium hirtzii Dodson – N. Ecuador.
 Phragmipedium klotzschianum (Rchb.f.) Rolfe  –  SE. Venezuela to Guyana and N. Brazil.
 Phragmipedium kovachii J.T.Atwood, Dalström & Ric.Fernández – San Martin, Peru
 Phragmipedium lindenii (Lindl.) Dressler & N.H.Williams – Venezuela to Ecuador.
 Phragmipedium lindleyanum (M.R.Schomb. ex Lindl.) Rolfe – N. South America to Pernambuco, Brazil.
 Phragmipedium longifolium (Warsz. & Rchb.f.) Rolfe – Costa Rica to Ecuador.
 Phragmipedium pearcei (Rchb.f.) Rauh & Senghas – Ecuador to N. Peru.
 Phragmipedium reticulatum (Rchb.f.) Schltr. – Ecuador to Peru.
 Phragmipedium richteri Roeth & O.Gruss – Peru.
 Phragmipedium schlimii (Linden ex Rchb.f.) – Colombia.
 Phragmipedium tetzlaffianum O.Gruss – Venezuela.
 Phragmipedium vittatum (Vell.) Rolfe – WC. & SE. Brazil.
 Phragmipedium warszewiczianum (Rchb.f.) Schltr. – Colombia to Ecuador.
 Phragmipedium warszewiczii (Rchb.f.) Christenson  – S Mexico to Panama.

Hybrids 
The following hybrids are recognized:
 Phragmipedium × colombianum O.Gruss
 Phragmipedium × merinoi O.Gruss
 Phragmipedium × roethianum O.Gruss & Kalina (Ecuador) (P. hirtzii x P. longifolium)

References 

 Albert, V.Z. & B.Pettersson, Expansion of Genus Paphiopedilum Pfitzer to Include All Conduplicate-leaved Slipper Orchids (Cypripedioideae: Orchidaceae). Lindleyana 9(2) 133-139 (1994).
 McCook, L. An Annotated Checklist of the Genus Phragmipedium - 28 p. - Special Publication of the Orchid Digest (1998).
 Gruss, O. 2003. A checklist of the genus Phragmipedium. Orchid Digest 67: 213-241.
 Braem, G. J., Ohlund, S., and Quene, R. J.  2004.  The real Phragmipedium warszewiczianum: a clarification of the Phragmipedium caudatum complex (Phragmipedium section Phragmipedium).  Orquideologia 23(2): 87-136
 Pridgeon, A.M.; Cribb, P.J.; Chase, M.W. & F. N. Rasmussen (1999): Genera Orchidacearum Vol.1, Oxford U. Press.

External links 
 

 
Orchid genera
Epiphytic orchids